Erik Hightower (born 6 April 1986) is an American Paralympic athlete who competes in wheelchair racing events at international elite competitions and has participated at three Paralympic Games. He is a double Parapan American Games champion and a World champion in the 4 x 100 metre relay. He is married to Kym Crosby who is also a Paralympic athlete.

Theft of wheelchair
In June 2014, Hightower's custom made $5,000 racing wheelchair was stolen from his cousin's truck in Anderson Township, Ohio. He had visited the Mercy Anderson Hospital to visit someone and then an hour later, he noticed that his chair had gone missing which he only had bought two months ago. He and his family were confused on why the perpetrator would steal his wheelchair that was "useless for anybody else", he had a theory that the culprit could be stealing his wheelchair to collect scrap metal and he contacted local scrap metal businesses to warn about his stolen wheelchair and reported the theft to the police. Hightower also asked for the CCTV footage of the hospital's car park but there was no camera coverage of the car park where his cousin's truck was parked.

His wheelchair was later recovered a week later when it was found in a baseball field in New Richmond.

References

1986 births
Living people
Track and field athletes from Phoenix, Arizona
Sportspeople from Chico, California
Paralympic track and field athletes of the United States
Athletes (track and field) at the 2008 Summer Paralympics
Athletes (track and field) at the 2016 Summer Paralympics
Athletes (track and field) at the 2020 Summer Paralympics
Medalists at the 2007 Parapan American Games
Medalists at the 2011 Parapan American Games
Medalists at the 2015 Parapan American Games
Medalists at the 2019 Parapan American Games
People with spina bifida